Aramais Vardani Hovsepian (Armenian: Արամայիս Վարդանի Հովսեփյան), known as Arman Hovsepian (February 21, 1921 – August 18, 1980) was an Iranian Armenian actor.

Biography 
He was born Aramais Vardan Hovsepian, on 21 February 1921 in Tabriz. He started performing in school theaters before he landed a major role in Namus in 1940 and entered nonprofessional theater. He moved to Tehran in 1954 and joined the theater group of Ararat Club and worked with celebrities like Joseph Vaezian, Samuel Khachikian, and Aramais Aghamalian.

He made his first screen debut in Khachikian's first film, The Return (1953), and opted to act mainly in his following pictures: A Girl From Shiraz, Crossroads of Incidents, Blood and Grace, Storm in Our Town, A Cry at Midnight, and Apprehension. Arman was one of the distinctive actors of the 1950s and 1960s Iranian cinema, and the brand of characters he portrayed was mostly rich people gone bankrupt or confronted with serious problems. He tried his hand in directing and producing films with Bride of the Sea in 1965 and raised his production to five. The Tenant (1972) was another movie he directed, produced, and played. He was also the actor and producer of two films by Mohammad Deljou and Amir Mojahed: Cronies (1974) and The Night of the Loners (1975). He died on August 8, 1980 at the age 59 in Barcelona and was buried at Christian Armenian Burastan Cemetery in Tehran.

Filmography

 1980 Crossing the Night 
 1979 Goft har se nafareshan 
 1975 Mamal Amricayi 
 1975 Night of Foreigners 
 1974 The Compromise 
 1972 Ghadir 
 1972 The Spring (TV movie) 
 1971 For Whom the Hearts Beat 
 1971 Jan-sakht 
 1970 Ghesseye shab-e Yalda 
 1970 Wrath of Eagles 
 1970 Leyli and Majnoon 
 1969 Pesaran-e Gharoon 
 1968 Charkh-E-Bazigar 
 1968 Poli be sooye behesht 
 1966 Rebellion 
 1966 Shamsi pahlevoon 
 1965 Croesus' Treasure 
 1965 The Bride of the Sea (also director)
 1964 The Devil Is Knocking 
 1964 The Humans 
 1964 The Strike 
 1963 Highway of Death 
 1962 Anxiety 
 1961 The Bum 
 1961 The Midnight Terror 
 1958 Storm in Our Town 
 1955 The Crossroad of Events 
 1955 Blood and Honor 
 1953 A Girl From Shiraz

References

External links

Iranian film directors
Iranian film producers
Iranian male film actors
Persian-language film directors
People from Tabriz
Iranian people of Armenian descent
1921 births
1980 deaths
20th-century Iranian male actors
Iranian expatriates in Spain